The Howth Tram on the Hill of Howth Tramway was a tram which served Howth Head, near Dublin, Ireland. The termini were at Sutton railway station, by the entrance to the peninsula, and Howth railway station by the village and harbour of Howth.

Design
The line of the route was designed in-house by the Great Northern Rail staff at their Dublin office, under William Hemingway Mills, chief engineer. The engineer responsible for the detailed design was Joshua Harrison Hargrave, the famous Cork-born photographer/engineer.

History
The service operated from June 1901 to 31 May 1959 and was run by the Great Northern Railway (Ireland) (GNR(I)), which viewed it as a way to bring more customers to its railway stations at Sutton and Howth. The tramway replaced a horse bus service, which had run since 1867.

Closure and replacement

On 1 October 1958, Córas Iompair Éireann (CIÉ) took over GNR(I)'s operations in the Republic of Ireland, including the Howth Tram. A year later, the tramway was closed down. It was initially replaced by two CIÉ bus routes – numbers 87 (Sutton to Ceanchor Road) and 88 (Howth to Windgate Road). Two routes were necessary, as several narrow hill curves were not passable by the buses used. Eventually, sections of the disused tram route between the Baily post office and the Summit were expanded to form an extension of Carrickbrack Road; this enabled a single bus route (number 88) to be used.

The area was then served by the 31, 31a and 31b bus routes, which operated from Abbey Street in the city centre. In winter, icy roads on the hill occasionally cause the bus service to be suspended, unlike the tram, which ran in all weather conditions. A public footpath now follows the tram route between Howth station and the Summit.

Preservation

Four of the trams survive in preservation. No. 9 is now exhibited at the National Transport Museum of Ireland, which is located at Howth Castle, near the former terminus of the tramway at Howth railway station. No. 4 is on display the Ulster Folk and Transport Museum at Cultra. No. 10 is preserved at the National Tramway Museum in Derbyshire, England; it has been converted to 4' 8.5" gauge and had previously run on the Blackpool Tramway from 1985-89. No. 2 is at the Southern California Railway Museum, California, USA, in operating condition; it has also been converted to 4' 8.5" gauge.

Possible plans to reinstate the tramway
In 2016 Fingal County Council announced that it was issuing an invitation to tender for options for potential reinstatement of the Howth Tramway or part of it, as a possible tourist attraction. Proposals which have been considered included the option of a horse-drawn tram on tracks along the seafront.

Route

Electric double-decker tramcars ran the five-mile route, which went from Sutton station along Greenfield Road and Carrickbrack Road to St. Fintan's Cemetery, then past the Baily post office and Stella Maris convent to Howth Summit. From there, the tramway ran down into Howth, terminating at the railway station. Most of the route was single track, with passing points at the main stopping places.

Stops

See also
 Dublin United Transport Company - The largest tramway operator in Dublin (pre-1945)
 Clontarf and Hill of Howth Tramroad
 Dublin and Blessington Steam Tramway 
 Dublin tram system

References

Footnotes

Sources

Further reading
 Kilroy, James: Howth and her Trams: Stories and Sketches of the Howth Tram, Fingal Books, Dublin (1986). 
 Kilroy, James: Trams to the Hill of Howth: A Photographic Tribute, Colourpoint Books, Newtownards, Co. Down (1998) ,

External links

 National Transport Museum of Ireland
 Picture gallery at trolleybus.net
 Once upon a Tram, 1958 film of the Hill of Howth Tram

Hill of Howth Tramway
Howth
Irish gauge railways
Tram transport in the Republic of Ireland
Transport in Fingal